John Ryan "J. R." Fitzpatrick (born May 9, 1988) is a Canadian professional stock car racing driver. Fitzpatrick was the youngest driver to ever win the now defunct CASCAR Super Series championship, winning in the series' final season of 2006 at the age of 18.

Early career
John Ryan (J. R.) Fitzpatrick was born in Cambridge, Ontario, and got his first taste of racing in karts at the age of six, moving quickly to the Canadian Association for Stock Car Auto Racing (CASCAR) junior ranks and then on to Late Model stock cars by the time he was 13 years old.

Racing in the CASCAR Super Series what is now the NASCAR Canadian Tire Series at age 16, Fitzpatrick finished 11th in the point standings and second in the Rookie of the Year standings in 2004. Then at 17, he achieved three top-five and five top-10 finishes, scoring his first win. At age 18, he became the youngest driver to become a Canadian Tire Series National Champion with one win, five podium finishes and two pole awards.

Racing career

NASCAR Canadian Tire Series
He remained in his fathers No. 84 Chevrolet after CASCAR was acquired by NASCAR;  In 2007, Fitzpatrick earned two wins, four top-fives, seven top-10s and three pole awards in the Canadian Tire Series where sponsorship came from Milwaukee Tools. In 2008 he had one victory (Mosport), five top-fives, six top-10s and two pole awards. During 2009, he drove the No. 84 for a part-time deal winning Circuit Gilles Villeneuve leading the most laps. For 2010 he returned to the series full-time with sponsorship from Schick he picked up his first win of the season at Mosport on the road course layout on June 13 and also won the event at Edmonton, he swapped the points lead with D. J. Kennington for over five times during the year going on to finishes second in the points. He ran again in the series in 2011, finishing third in points. He returned to the Canadian Tire Series in 2012 and won the seasons first event at Canadian Tire Motorsport Park he also won the Series's largest even Montreal and finished second in points.

Sprint Cup Series
In early 2012 it was announced that Fitzpatrick would compete in the Sprint Cup Series' Heluva Good! Sour Cream Dips at The Glen race in August 2012 at Watkins Glen International for Turn One Racing. Fitzpatrick and Turn One Racing would cut ties in early 2012, and the deal never materialized.

Nationwide Series
Fitzpatrick made his mainstream NASCAR debut in the Busch Series race at the Telcel-Motorola Mexico 200 at the Autodromo Hermanos Rodriguez in Mexico City, Mexico. He came in 33rd place in that race due to an ill handling racecar. He finished 43rd in the NASCAR Busch Series race at Circuit Gilles Villeneuve in Montreal, Quebec on August 4, 2007, right after the NASCAR Canadian Tire Series race at the same track where he won the race “I was very tired” stating J.R. He drove the famed No. 4 KHI Chevy at both of the road courses in 2009. He Finishing 19th at Watkins Glen after getting in a wreck on the last lap. In Montreal he was on pace for a top 10 finish before stalling the car after going off course leading to a poor finish one lap down. It was announced that J.R. will drive for Dale Earnhardt Jr. in all three road course in his No. 7 team for 2010, he picked up his first Nationwide top 10 coming home 7th at Road America on June 19 and his second top 10 with a 7th in Montreal. Fitzpatrick returned to the Nationwide Series with Baker Curb Racing at Daytona International Speedway sponsored by Schick. However, he finished 42nd in the race. He competed in six further races during the year for Go Canada Racing.

Camping World Truck Series
On February 13, 2009, Fitzpatrick finished fourth in his No. 7 Mammoet Chevrolet Silverado at Daytona International Speedway during the NextEra Energy Resources 250 Camping World Truck Series Event. Fitzpatrick led 17 laps in the event, his third race in the series and first at a restrictor plate track.  After Martinsville his deal with Kevin Buckler at TRG Motorsports fell through and he was a free agent. After driving several races for Kevin Harvick, Inc. and Chase Mattioli in 2009 and 2011, he was scheduled to drive full-time in 2012, driving the No. 60 Chevrolet for Turn One Racing, although he would be released after the first two races.

Motorsports career results

NASCAR
(key) (Bold – Pole position awarded by qualifying time. Italics – Pole position earned by points standings or practice time. * – Most laps led.)

Nationwide Series

Camping World Truck Series

Canadian Tire Series

 Season still in progress
 Ineligible for series points

CASCAR

Castrol Super Series

Parts For Trucks Prostock Tour

Parts For Trucks Pro Stock Tour

Gallery

References

External links
 
 

Living people
1988 births
People from Cambridge, Ontario
Racing drivers from Ontario
NASCAR drivers
Canadian people of Irish descent
CASCAR Super Series drivers
JR Motorsports drivers